Oaş may refer to:

Oaş Country, an ethnographic region in northwestern Romania
Negreşti-Oaş, a town in Satu Mare County
Călineşti-Oaş, a commune in Satu Mare County
Oaş, a village in Frata Commune, Cluj County, Romania